The Women's omnium was held on 22–23 October 2011. 18 riders participated over six competitions.

Medalists

Results

Flying lap
The flying lap was held at 15:34.

Points race
The race was held at 19:42.

Elimination race
The race was held at 21:13.

Individual pursuit
The race was held at 13:30.

Scratch race
The race was held at 16:06.

500m time trial
The race was held at 18:01.

Final Classification
After six events.

References

2011 European Track Championships
European Track Championships – Women's omnium